Matthew Martin Joseph Tierney (born July 4, 1996) is a Canadian rugby union player. He currently plays for Castres Olympique in the Top14.

References

External links
 

1996 births
Living people
Canada international rugby union players
Canadian rugby union players
Section Paloise players
Rugby union props
Sportspeople from Mississauga